The 1979 World Cup took place 8–11 November at the Glyfada Golf Club, 13 kilometres south of the city center of Athens, Greece, located in the Athens Riviera. It was the 27th World Cup event. The tournament was a 72-hole stroke play team event with 46 notified teams. Each team consisted of two players from a country. The South Africa team was invited to the event and their team of Hugh Baiocchi and Dale Hayes took part in practice and pro-am competition, but was informed by the Greece government shortly before the beginning of competition, they were not allowed to start. The combined score of each team determined the team results. The United States team of John Mahaffey and Hale Irwin won by ten strokes over the Scotland team of Ken Brown and Sandy Lyle.

The individual competition for the International Trophy was won by Irwin two strokes ahead of Bernhard Langer, West Germany and Lyle, Scotland.

Teams 

(a) denotes amateur 

Note: Sayed Cherif was representing Sweden, having played for Egypt in previous World Cup events.

Scores 
Team

Dassù of Italy was disqualified after signing an incorrect scorecard.

International Trophy

Sources:

References

World Cup (men's golf)
Golf tournaments in Greece
Sports competitions in Athens
World Cup golf
World Cup golf
World Cup golf